Gabriel Filmtheater was located in Maxvorstadt, Munich, Bavaria, Germany. It was considered to be the world's oldest cinema still open until its closure in April 2019.

Buildings and structures in Munich
Maxvorstadt